Hermann Friedrich Emmrich (Meiningen, February 7, 1815 – Meiningen, 24 January 1879) was a German geologist.

He received his Ph.D. in philosophy and taught at the Institute of Meiningen (Henfling-Gymnasium Meiningen).

He described the trilobite genera Phacops, Odontopleura and Trinucleus.

He published Zur Naturgeschichte der Trilobiten (On the natural history of trilobites) in 1839 and Geologischem Geschichte des Alpes (Geological history of the Alps) in 1874.

The trilobite genus Emmrichops was named in his honor.

References 

This article or an earlier version is (partially) translated from the Spanish Wikipedia, which parts fall under the Creative Commons Attribution. See this page for editing history.

German paleontologists
1815 births
1879 deaths